In Search of Sunrise 12: Dubai is a compilation album by Dutch trance producer Richard Durand in collaboration with Lange. It was released on June 2, 2014 by SongBird. It is the twelfth installment in the In Search of Sunrise compilation series.

Track listing

References

External links 
 In Search of Sunrise 12: Dubai at Black Hole Official Online Store

Electronic compilation albums
2014 compilation albums